Diyi Yang is a Chinese computer scientist and assistant professor of computer science at Stanford University. Her research combines linguistics and social sciences with machine learning to address social problems like online harassment, as well as user-centered text generation and learning with limited data.

Biography 
Diyi Yang attended Shanghai Jiao Tong University for her undergraduate studies, earning a Bachelor of Science degree in Computer Science in July 2013. She received an M.S. (May 2015) and Ph.D. (February 2019) degrees from Carnegie Mellon University Language Technologies Institute. For her dissertation work, Yang developed algorithms for understanding computational social roles by bringing together machine learning techniques with sociology and social psychology. Upon completing her PhD, Yang became an assistant professor at the Georgia Tech College of Computing. In 2022, Yang moved to Stanford University where she now leads the Social and Language Technologies (SALT) Lab.

Recognition 
In 2020, Yang was named one of IEEE AI's 10 To Watch, and in 2021, she was awarded Samsung AI Researcher of the Year, Intel Rising Star, and was listed in the Forbes 30 Under 30 for Science.

References

External links 
Official Website

Year of birth missing (living people)
Living people
Stanford University Department of Computer Science faculty
Chinese expatriates in the United States
Shanghai Jiao Tong University alumni
Carnegie Mellon University alumni
21st-century Chinese women scientists
Chinese women computer scientists
Chinese computer scientists